Sobrightttttttt is the debut studio album of South Korean singer-songwriter Sogumm. It was released on October 21, 2019, through Balming Tiger. It was later nominated for Best R&B Album at the Korean Music Awards.

Background 
In an interview with Hypebeast Korea, Sogumm shared the story behind the album title.
My real name is So-hee. Its Chinese characters mean white and bright. I always say "so bright" to describe myself, so I thought that it was perfect for the title of my first album.

Music and lyrics 
Wnjn actively uses a synthesizer with damp texture on top of electronic and ambient sounds and creates a unique mood by throwing in unusual sources. Meanwhile, Sogumm's vocal sounds as if she is whispering next to you in her characteristic mumbling tone creating a "wavy" groove.

Sogumm "sinks down lifelessly" while sending a negative message in "Kill Me" but immediately shows off her brilliance and energy in "Dance!". She breaks the boundaries between rapping and singing in "Kimchisoup" but sings "So Fast" clearly on a vivid acoustic guitar melody. She expresses her complex emotions while repeating electronic piano sounds on a boom bap beat in "Smile".

Critical reception 
Hwang Du-ha of Rhythmer rated the album 4 out of 5 stars. He wrote that it "presents a new side of alternative R&B".

Kim Do-heon of IZM rated the album 2.5 out of 5 stars. He wrote that it is suitable for telling listeners what kind of musician Sogumm is. However, it is not memorable because "only the senses and emotions remain and the rest is a blur."

Year-end lists

Awards and nominations

Track listing

References 

2019 debut albums
Rhythm and blues albums by South Korean artists